Dallol may refer to:

 Dallol, Ethiopia
 Dallol (hydrothermal system)
 Dallol (woreda)
 Dallol (volcano)